KBTN (1420 AM) is a radio station broadcasting a sports talk format. Licensed to Neosho, Missouri, United States, the station serves the Neosho, Missouri, area. The station is currently owned by American Media Investments, and features programming from Citadel Media and CNN News.

History
From its inception until the introduction of KBTN-FM, KBTN (AM) was a community-minded, low-power station that broadcast local news, local sports, and in-house produced programming. From the 1950s to the 1990s, the station broadcast on a dawn-to-dusk schedule at a power of 500 watts. A well-remembered announcer, "Herkimer P. Pushbroom" (Joe Johnson), greeted early morning risers for years, along with his fictional sidekick, "Homer" the rooster. David Winegardner owned and managed the station from 1974 through the years 2000. KBTN played a major role in the emergency notifications during the tornado of 1975, saving many lives.

Expanded Band assignment
On March 17, 1997 the Federal Communications Commission (FCC) announced that eighty-eight stations had been given permission to move to newly available "Expanded Band" transmitting frequencies, ranging from 1610 to 1700 kHz, with KBTN authorized to move from 1420 to 1670 kHz. However, the station never procured the Construction Permit needed to implement the authorization, so the expanded band station was never built.

Later history
Station call letters were changed to KQYS on March 16, 2006, but changed back to KBTN on May 28, 2008.

On January 31, 2022, the station fliped its format from classic rock to sports.

References

External links

BTN
Sports radio stations in the United States
Radio stations established in 1954
1954 establishments in Missouri
Fox Sports Radio stations